During the 1998–99 season, the Spanish football club Deportivo Alavés placed 16th in La Liga. The team was eliminated in the third round of the Copa del Rey.

Season summary

Alavés competed in La Liga, the top flight of Spanish football, in 1998–99 for the first time since 1955–56, having won promotion as Segunda División champions in the previous season, which was their first under head coach Mané. Their first top flight campaign in 43 years saw them flirt with relegation, but they ultimately finished 16th, one point clear of Extremadura and the relegation playoff places. In the Copa del Rey, they failed to match their heroics of the previous year, when they reached the semi-finals. They received a bye to the third round, where they were eliminated on away goals after a 2–2 aggregate draw with Segunda División side Las Palmas.

Squad

Left club during season

La Liga

Appearances and goals
Last updated on 16 May 2021.

|-
|colspan="12"|Players who have left the club after the start of the season:

|}

See also
Deportivo Alavés
1998–99 La Liga
1998–99 Copa del Rey

References

Deportivo Alavés seasons
Deportivo Alavés